The Siege of Pinchgut (released in the US as Four Desperate Men) is a 1959 British thriller filmed on location in Sydney, Australia, and directed by Harry Watt. It was the last film produced by Ealing Studios, and was entered into the 9th Berlin International Film Festival where it was nominated for the Golden Bear Award.

Plot
An ambulance drives through Sydney, having been hijacked by escaped convict Matt Kirk and his three accomplices, Matt's brother Johnny, Italian Luke and Bert. The four men manage to avoid detection at Sydney Hospital, and head out through Sydney Harbour in a purchased vessel, intending to go north. However the boat breaks down before they can get through Sydney Heads and the men decide to take refuge in Fort Denison (also known as Pinchgut), unaware it is occupied by caretaker Pat Fulton, his wife and daughter Ann.

Kirk and the others take the Fultons hostage and decide to wait until the following night before leaving again. A boatload of tourists arrives but Pat Fulton manages to act as if everything is normal. However, when a police officer, Constable Macey, visits the fort bringing some milk, Ann Fulton screams for help and the authorities are alerted to the kidnappers' presence.

A siege situation results, with the police led by Superintendent Hanna. Matt Kirby is initially reluctant to hurt anyone, but becomes less stable after his brother Johnny is shot and injured by Constable Macey. Bert, who is an ex-naval gunner, realises the gun on Fort Denison could be fired at a nearby munitions ship in the harbour and cause tremendous damage similar to the Bombay Explosion of 1944. However, shells for the gun are locked behind three heavy doors at the bottom of the fort, which need to be laboriously prised open. Kirby demands a retrial for his conviction in exchange for not firing the gun.

The police order an evacuation of harbourside suburbs and the stealthy unloading of the munitions boat. They position snipers around the fort as they try to negotiate a peaceful surrender. The injured Johnny starts to develop feelings towards Ann Fulton and suggests they surrender, but Matt refuses. Luke is shot dead by police snipers, and a sailor on the munitions ship is trapped under some crates. Bert and Matt manage to retrieve the ammunition and are in the process of transferring it to the gun when Bert is shot and killed. Matt loads the gun and prepares to fire when Johnny reveals that he has disabled the firing pin. A furious Matt tries to kill Johnny. Hanna leads a squad of police as they raid the island and Matt is killed. Johnny is arrested  and taken away, but not before Pat Fulton promises to speak up for him.

Cast

 Aldo Ray as Matt Kirk
 Heather Sears as Ann Fulton
 Neil McCallum as Johnny Kirk
 Victor Maddern as Bert
 Carlo Giustini as Luke (as Carlo Justini)
 Alan Tilvern as Superintendent Hanna
 Barbara Mullen as Mrs Fulton
 Gerry Duggan as Pat Fulton
 Kenneth J. Warren as Police Commissioner (as Kenneth Warren)
 Grant Taylor as Constable Macey
 Deryck Barnes as Sergeant Drake (as Derek Barnes)
 Richard Vernon as Under Secretary
 Ewan MacDuff as Naval Captain
 Martin Boddey as Brigadier
 Barry Foster as Charlie Patterson (uncredited)
 Glyn Houston as Navy Rating (uncredited)
 George Woodbridge as Newspaper Editor (uncredited)

Saturday to Monday
The story was written by Australian filmmaker Lee Robinson and British editor Inman Hunter in 1949 when both were working in Sydney at the Film Division of the Department of the Interior. The original idea began with Hunter, who saw Fort Denison while travelling on the Sydney ferry shortly after arriving in Australia, and thought it would make a perfect location for a film. Lee Robinson had worked as an anti-aircraft gunner on Denison in the early days of the war, and together they developed a story about two German POWs who escape during World War II and take over Fort Denison, then hold Sydney to ransom by threatening to fire a gun there on a munitions ship.

In 1950 Robinson and Hunter announced the film would go into production the following year under the name Saturday to Monday, with both intending to direct. The following year it was announced the film would be the first of three made by a new company, One World Film Productions. The story would be about two escaping prisoners who board a tourist launch at Fort Macquarie and inspect Pinchgut. They remain behind after other tourists have gone and imprison a soldier who is there to guard some army equipment left behind after the war. They commence a siege, threatening to fire an anti-aircraft gun at the city. The second film would be about the pearling industry  and the third would be set in Kosciusko National Park.

However although they secured some backing they were unable to get the necessary finance, and their script was sold to Ealing Studios.

Ealing Studios
The film was eventually directed by Harry Watt, who had previously made two feature films in Australia for Ealing. He had resigned from the company in 1955 to work for Granada Television, but had not enjoyed the experience and asked to return after eighteen months. Watt came across the script and became enthusiastic about its possibilities. It was the only one of Watt's three Australian films made without a historical basis and was a deliberate attempt on the director's part to create a commercially successful film.

Watt went to Australia in February 1958 to begin pre production on the project, then called The Siege. Watt said that month he had a 60 page treatment which he wanted to spend the next two-three months turning into a full script. "I largely walk around, listening to how people talk, and learning how Australians should behave and feel," he said.

Watt said the Robinson-Hunter story "was a hell of a good idea. But it now has a completely different set of characters."  he story so it was no longer about a German POW, but an escaped convict fighting to prove his innocence to an uncaring judicial system.

Watt said the story "is basically a character study of a man, an escaped convict with a persecution complex. But it is also an action picture.. a thriller. I have always wanted to make a film of this modern city. But it has to appeal to the world; otherwise it goes on the shelf, and I feel The Siege will appeal to America and Britain and Europe."

Watt travelled out to Fort Denison and was "delighted with it. It's a wonderful location, from every angle you turn."

Watt felt that Sydney had not changed too much in the 12 years he was last in the city. He felt the people had become friendlier and less insular, and that the city was "spreading all over the place... like lave" and "I am still enormously struck by the number of good looking girls." He then returned to Britain but returned months later to begin the film.

The script was assigned to British writer Alexander Baron, who brought in his friend, Australian novelist Jon Cleary, to help him with the dialogue. This was done despite reservations of Michael Balcon who worried that Cleary's involvement would make the script "too Australian". Reportedly, Baron's contribution to the movie was minimal and the screenplay was done by Watt in collaboration with Cleary.

Casting
Associated British insisted on casting a name actor in the lead role of Matt Kirk, and American Aldo Ray was selected. This meant the nationality of Matt and his brother Johnny was changed to American. The rest of the key cast were imported, with only supporting roles given to Australians. Heather Sears and Barbara Mullins came from England; Jerry Duggan was an Irishman who had recently settled in Australia. Neil McCallum was Canadian and Carlo Justini came from Italy. Watt said "I'm making it a sort of international cast because I think that is right now for Australia."

It was reported that more than 30 Australians would have speaking parts.

(In January 1959 Hedda Hopper reported that Stewart Granger turned down $200,000 to make The Siege in Australia because his mother was visiting from England.)

Filming
Filming began on 30 November 1958 under the title The Siege at Fort Denison. The Maritime Services Board picked that day to start repairs on the Martello round tower on the fort, causing "a real mess up" according to the Sydney Morning Herald. Shooting took place on the fort for three weeks.

Over sixty technicians were imported from Britain to make the movie, although production facilities were provided by a local company, Southern International Productions, which had been established by Lee Robinson.

"Marvellous setting, this fort" said associate producer Eric Williams. "Ideal for a film - it has a real medieval touch."

The Australian National Line agreed to anchor a freighter in Farm Cove for the filmmakers to depict an ammunition boat.

Scenes were shot in police headquarters in Philip Street, the Town Hall clock, Bondi beach. Watt said in the scenes were the public was warned about the attack "no one takes any notice of it, of course. It's real Sydney."

Ealing Studios were in flux during production. They had just completed six films for MGM – including the Australian-set The Shiralee (1957) – before moving over to Associated British Picture Corporation at Elstree. The association would prove to be an unhappy one and this film wound up being the last one ever made under the Ealing banner.

Soon after filming began, Associated British announced they no longer wished to continue Ealing's production programme. Jon Cleary says this hurt morale and that Watt's "heart wasn't in it" when making the movie. Production was also held up when Aldo Ray tore a leg muscle while jumping into a boat.

Reception
The film was entered in the 1959 Berlin Film Festival and released in the UK and Australia. Although aged almost 50, Gerry Duggan was nominated for the BAFTA Film Award for Newcomer to Leading Film Roles in 1960 for his role as Pat Fulton.  He lost to the 13-year-old Hayley Mills in Tiger Bay.

Critical
In England The Guardian said it had "a story with depth and real life which sometimes holds up the pace of what must succeed as a thriller."

The film was not released in Australia until July 1960. The Sydney Morning Herald said "as a thriller, it is not half as bad as has been painted.". The Age said Watt was "seen at his best and his worst in this piece of tough suspense. His best is the real life location work. His worst is the fictional character studies and their melodrama."

Box office
It was not a success at the box office and turned out to be not only the last movie made by Ealing, but the last adult feature film Watt ever directed.

Later reputation
However, the film's reputation has risen in recent years: Quentin Tarantino screened it at the Quentin Tarantino Film Festival in Texas, and in 2006 it was restored by the National Film and Sound Archive. It has historical value, depicting postwar Sydney, its harbour foreshore and the remains of the Fort Macquarie Tram Depot which was being demolished for construction of the Sydney Opera House.

References

External links

The Siege (the original production) at National Film and Sound Archive
The Siege of Pinchgut at National Film and Sound Archive
The Siege of Pinchgut at Oz Movies

1959 films
1950s adventure thriller films
British adventure thriller films
Films shot at Associated British Studios
British black-and-white films
Films directed by Harry Watt
Ealing Studios films
Films shot in Sydney
Films produced by Michael Balcon
1950s English-language films
1950s British films